Vladimir Virchis (18 August 1973 – 28 January 2022) was a Ukrainian professional boxer. Competing from  1999 to 2009, he held the European heavyweight title from 2006 to 2008.

Life and career
Virchis, born in Kakhovka, Kherson Oblast, Ukrainian SSR, was known as "The Hunter." Large and powerful, he turned professional in 1999 and won his first 20 bouts with 17 knockouts, including victories over club fighters Julius Francis, Cliff Couser, and Michael Sprott.

Virchis' career was sidetracked in 2007 when he faced undefeated amateur star Ruslan Chagaev and lost a controversial majority decision. Later that same year, he rebounded by knocking out European champion, Paolo Vidoz.

In late 2008 Virchis lost a decision to Juan Carlos Gomez. Virchis had alcohol before the match, and he was drunk while fighting. After the loss a disappointed Virchis announced his retirement from the sport.

On the night from 27–28 January 2022, Virchis' was found dead of suicide by hanging on Raisa Okipna Street in Kyiv. He was 48, and his body was identified by his wife.

Professional boxing record

|-
|align="center" colspan=8|26 Wins (21 knockouts, 5 decisions) 2 Losses (2 decisions) 
|-
| align="center" style="border-style: none none solid solid; background: #e3e3e3"|Result
| align="center" style="border-style: none none solid solid; background: #e3e3e3"|OppRecord
| align="center" style="border-style: none none solid solid; background: #e3e3e3"|Opponent
| align="center" style="border-style: none none solid solid; background: #e3e3e3"|Type
| align="center" style="border-style: none none solid solid; background: #e3e3e3"|Round
| align="center" style="border-style: none none solid solid; background: #e3e3e3"|Date
| align="center" style="border-style: none none solid solid; background: #e3e3e3"|Location
| align="center" style="border-style: none none solid solid; background: #e3e3e3"|Notes
|-align=center
|Win
|
|align=left| Edgars Kalnārs
|UD
|6
|24 October 2009
|align=left| Kugelbake Halle, Cuxhaven, Lower Saxony
|
|-
|Loss
|
|align=left| Juan Carlos Gómez
|UD
|12
|27 September 2008
|align=left| Color Line Arena, Altona, Hamburg
|
|-
|Win
|
|align=left| Robert Hawkins
|KO
|5
|17 November 2007
|align=left| Bordelandhalle, Magdeburg, Saxony-Anhalt
|
|-
|Win
|
|align=left| Paolo Vidoz
|UD
|12
|19 May 2007
|align=left| Color Line Arena, Altona, Hamburg
|align=left|
|-
|Win
|
|align=left| Ihar Shukala
|TKO
|1
|23 February 2007
|align=left| Palace of Sports, Kyiv
|align=left|
|-
|Win
|
|align=left| Marcus McGee
|KO
|3
|13 January 2007
|align=left| Brandberge Arena, Halle an der Saale, Saxony-Anhalt
|
|-
|Win
|
|align=left| Paolo Vidoz
|KO
|6
|15 July 2006
|align=left| Color Line Arena, Altona, Hamburg
|align=left|
|-
|Loss
|
|align=left| Ruslan Chagaev
|MD
|12
|11 March 2006
|align=left| Color Line Arena, Altona, Hamburg
|align=left|
|-
|Win
|
|align=left| Michael Sprott
|UD
|12
|13 December 2005
|align=left| Freizeit Arena, Soelden
|align=left|
|-
|Win
|
|align=left| Lisandro Ezequiel Díaz
|TKO
|1
|10 September 2005
|align=left| Dm-Arena, Karlsruhe, Baden-Württemberg
|align=left|
|-
|Win
|
|align=left| Adnan Serin
|KO
|1
|10 May 2005
|align=left| Pueblo Espanol, Palma de Mallorca, Balearic Islands
|
|-
|Win
|
|align=left| Taras Bidenko
|TKO
|12
|29 March 2005
|align=left| Sporthalle, Wandsbek, Hamburg
|align=left|
|-
|Win
|
|align=left| Cliff Couser
|TKO
|5
|26 June 2004
|align=left| Zorianyi Hall, Feodosiya
|align=left|
|-
|Win
|
|align=left| Balu Sauer
|KO
|8
|31 January 2004
|align=left| Palace of Sports, Kyiv
|align=left|
|-
|Win
|
|align=left| Julius Francis
|UD
|12
|6 September 2003
|align=left| Palace of Sports, Kyiv
|align=left|
|-
|Win
|
|align=left| Valeriy Klymenko
|TKO
|1
|19 July 2003
|align=left| Oasis Entertaining Complex, Kyiv
|align=left|
|-
|Win
|
|align=left| Farhat Chaanoune
|UD
|8
|31 May 2003
|align=left| Brandenburg Halle, Frankfurt, Brandenburg
|align=left|
|-
|Win
|
|align=left| Mihail Bekish
|TKO
|10
|22 February 2003
|align=left| Circus, Kharkiv
|align=left|
|-
|Win
|
|align=left| Igor Petrenco
|TKO
|2
|28 September 2002
|align=left| Mykolaiv
|align=left|
|-
|Win
|
|align=left| Thomas Williams
|KO
|1
|21 September 2002
|align=left| Circus, Kyiv
|align=left|
|-
|Win
|
|align=left| Yuriy Yelistratov
|KO
|1
|23 March 2002
|align=left| Circus, Kyiv
|align=left|
|-
|Win
|
|align=left| Serhiy Ivanets
|KO
|2
|15 June 2001
|align=left| Casino Bingo, Kyiv
|align=left|
|-
|Win
|
|align=left| Roman Kapytonenko
|KO
|1
|30 April 2001
|align=left| Circus, Kyiv
|align=left|
|-
|Win
|
|align=left| Stanislav Tovkachov
|RTD
|3
|27 January 2001
|align=left| Nadiya Sport Palace, Mykolaiv
|
|-
|Win
|
|align=left| Oleksandr Myleiko
|TKO
|3
|4 March 2000
|align=left| Kherson
|align=left|
|-
|Win
|
|align=left| Ruslan Qurbonov
|TKO
|2
|16 January 2000
|align=left| Poltava
|align=left|
|-
|Win
|
|align=left| Oleksandr Myleiko
|TKO
|5
|16 October 1999
|align=left| Chernihiv
|align=left|
|-
|Win
|
|align=left| Andriy Oliynyk
|KO
|2
|24 August 1999
|align=left| Sumy
|align=left|
|}

References

External links
 

1973 births
2022 deaths
2022 suicides
European Boxing Union champions
Heavyweight boxers
Sportspeople from Kyiv
Suicides by hanging in Ukraine
Ukrainian male boxers